Cocodrilos Sports Park is a multi-use stadium in Caracas, Venezuela.  It is currently used mostly for football matches and is the part-time home stadium of Caracas Fútbol Club along with Estadio Brígido Iriarte.   The stadium holds 3,500 people.

External links

Cocodrilos Sports Park.com

Football venues in Caracas
Sports venues in Caracas
Sports venues completed in 2005
2005 establishments in Venezuela